Brule County is a county in the U.S. state of South Dakota. As of the 2020 census, the population was 5,247. Its county seat is Chamberlain.

History
Brule County was created on January 14, 1875, of territory partitioned from Charles Mix County. Its governing structure was also created at that time. However, in May 1875, Brule County was withdrawn from settlement, by order of US President Grant. This order was later annulled, and the organization of Brule County governing structure was completed in September 1879.

On March 9, 1883, the area of Brule County was slightly increased by an addition of former Buffalo County lands. The total area of Brule County was further increased on June 4, 1891, when American Island (in the Missouri River) was attached to the county (from the Sioux Reservation). Its boundaries have remained unchanged since that date.

Geography
The Missouri River flows southward along the western boundary line of Brule County. The county terrain consists of rolling hills, partially dedicated to agriculture.

Major highways
 Interstate 90
 South Dakota Highway 45
 South Dakota Highway 50

Adjacent counties
 Buffalo County - north
 Jerauld County - northeast
 Aurora County - east
 Charles Mix County - south
 Lyman County - west

Protected areas
 Boyer State Game Production Area
 Brule Bottom State Game Production Area
 Burning Brule State Game Production Area
 Chain lake State Game Production Area
 Chamberlain State Game Production Area
 Elm Creek State Game Production Area
 Elm Creek State Lakeside Use Area
 Hoover State Game Production Area
 Kimball State Game Production Area
 Lake Sixteen State Game Production Area

Lakes
 Lake Francis Case (part)
 Red Lake

Demographics

2000 census
As of the 2000 United States Census there were 5,364 people, 1,998 households, and 1,328 families in the county. The population density was 6 people per square mile (3/km2). There were 2,272 housing units at an average density of 3 per square mile (1/km2). The racial makeup of the county was 89.91% White, 0.26% Black or African American, 8.28% Native American, 0.48% Asian, 0.02% Pacific Islander, 0.06% from other races, and 0.99% from two or more races. 0.48% of the population were Hispanic or Latino of any race. 39.6% were of German, 9.5% Czech, 8.6% Norwegian, 7.8% Irish and 6.6% United States or American ancestry.

There were 1,998 households, out of which 31.00% had children under the age of 18 living with them, 56.20% were married couples living together, 7.20% had a female householder with no husband present, and 33.50% were non-families. 29.90% of all households were made up of individuals, and 13.10% had someone living alone who was 65 years of age or older. The average household size was 2.49 and the average family size was 3.14.

The county population contained 30.50% under the age of 18, 6.80% from 18 to 24, 24.70% from 25 to 44, 21.20% from 45 to 64, and 16.90% who were 65 years of age or older. The median age was 37 years. For every 100 females there were 93.20 males. For every 100 females age 18 and over, there were 92.10 males.

The median income for a household in the county was $32,370, and the median income for a family was $37,361. Males had a median income of $26,698 versus $20,094 for females. The per capita income for the county was $14,874. About 8.10% of families and 14.30% of the population were below the poverty line, including 14.30% of those under age 18 and 20.20% of those age 65 or over.

2010 census
As of the 2010 United States Census, there were 5,255 people, 2,136 households, and 1,375 families in the county. The racial makeup of the county was 88.4% white, 8.5% American Indian, 0.2% black or African American, 0.2% Asian, 0.3% from other races, and 2.4% from two or more races. Those of Hispanic or Latino origin made up 1.4% of the population. In terms of ancestry, 51.7% were German, 11.7% were Irish, 11.5% were Czech, 10.9% were Norwegian, 6.2% were English, and 1.3% were American.

Of the 2,136 households, 30.3% had children under the age of 18 living with them, 52.0% were married couples living together, 8.6% had a female householder with no husband present, 35.6% were non-families, and 30.5% of all households were made up of individuals. The average household size was 2.40 and the average family size was 3.03. The median age was 41.3 years.

The median income for a household in the county was $48,277 and the median income for a family was $58,363. Males had a median income of $33,958 versus $25,051 for females. The per capita income for the county was $19,779. About 9.8% of families and 9.1% of the population were below the poverty line, including 9.0% of those under age 18 and 10.6% of those age 65 or over.

Communities

Cities
 Chamberlain (county seat)
 Kimball

Town
 Pukwana

Census-designated places
 Bijou Hills

 Cedar Grove Colony
 Grass Ranch Colony

 Ola

Unincorporated community
 Grandview

Townships

 America
 Brule
 Chamberlain
 Cleveland
 Eagle
 Highland
 Kimball
 Lyon
 Ola
 Plainfield
 Pleasant Grove
 Plummer
 Pukwana
 Red Lake
 Richland
 Smith
 Torrey Lake
 Waldro
 West Point
 Wilbur
 Willow Lake
 Union

Politics
For the first century of South Dakota statehood, the predominately white voters of Brule County favored the Democratic Party. The county favored a Republican presidential candidate on just three occasions between 1896 and 1976. In the national landslide victories of Theodore Roosevelt, Harding and Dwight D. Eisenhower, when each candidate swept every other county in South Dakota, none obtained more than 53.1 percent of Brule County's vote. Richard Nixon, running against favorite son George McGovern in 1972, did not gain 46 percent in Brule County, while he was sweeping all but 129 other counties nationwide.

Since the “Reagan Revolution”, voters in Brule County have shifted to favor Republican presidential candidates. Michael Dukakis in 1988 was the last Democrat to win a majority in Brule County, although Bill Clinton twice obtained a plurality. Four of the past five Republican nominees have won over 58 percent of Brule County's vote.

See also
National Register of Historic Places listings in Brule County, South Dakota

References

 
South Dakota counties on the Missouri River
1879 establishments in Dakota Territory
Populated places established in 1879